Tassels in the Air is a 1938 short subject directed by Charley Chase starring American slapstick comedy team The Three Stooges (Moe Howard, Larry Fine and Curly Howard). It is the 30th entry in the series released by Columbia Pictures starring the comedians, who released 190 shorts for the studio between 1934 and 1959.

Plot
Nouveau riche housewife Mrs. Smirch (Bess Flowers) has intentions to hire the in-demand interior decorator Omay (Jean De Briac) to redecorate her house in a bid to get in the "who's who" of the local rich elite. Omay accepts her offer.

Meanwhile, the Stooges are hired as painters to redecorate the building where Omay's office is and are given the job of painting temporary names on the doors of all the offices.  They, of course, botch the job. It comes out that Curly has a strange proclivity to fly into a blind rage whenever he sees a tassel, placated only with soft tickling of his chin.

Mrs. Smirch enters the building and mistakes Moe for Omay (as Moe's name in Pig Latin is Oe-may). The real Omay, offended that his office was mislabeled as the janitor's closet, gives up his lease. The boys' boss (Vernon Dent) immediately fires them, and they take on the ruse of Omay and his two colleagues with intention of doing the work on the Smirch household.

They arrive at the Smirch's residence and begin to work as Mrs. Smirch brings in a few of her new rich friends for a card game. However, the real Omay enters the home and exposes the boys as frauds, publicly embarrassing Mrs. Smirch.

Production notes
Tassels in the Air was filmed on November 26–30, 1937. The film's title is a play on the old expression, "Building castles in the air," i.e. dreaming of achieving the impossible.

Curly goes crazy whenever he sees tassels. The cure is to tickle him under his chin with a paintbrush, a similar variety of plot device to those used earlier in Punch Drunks, Horses' Collars and Grips, Grunts and Groans.

Many of the gags used in the table painting scene were originally used by Chase in his 1933 short Luncheon At Twelve. They would be reused by Moe, Larry and Shemp in their unsold television 1949 pilot Jerks of All Trades, which, coincidentally, also featured Symona Boniface. The gags would be recycled again the following year in A Snitch in Time.

References

External links 
 
 

1938 films
The Three Stooges films
American black-and-white films
1938 comedy films
Films directed by Charley Chase
Columbia Pictures short films
American slapstick comedy films
1930s English-language films
1930s American films